Sydney Gordon Rickards (12 April 1884 – 6 January 1948) was an  Australian rules footballer who played with St Kilda in the Victorian Football League (VFL).

References

External links 

St Kilda Player Encyclopedia

1884 births
1948 deaths
Australian rules footballers from Victoria (Australia)
St Kilda Football Club players